Stupid Little Golf Video (released as Leslie Nielsen's Stupid Little Golf Video in the United States) is the third and last of the how-to-golf-badly trilogy, following Bad Golf Made Easier and Bad Golf My Way.  it is the only one that has been released on DVD. Nielsen's wife Barberee Earl Nielsen makes a cameo as a lady golfer. The film was shot at the Banff Springs Hotel & Golf Course in Banff, Alberta, Canada and Los Angeles, California.

Cast
Leslie Nielsen as himself
Bob Donner as His Trusted Caddie
John Boswell as The Unsuspecting Golfer
Barbaree Earl Nielsen as Lady Golfer 1
Stephanie Faracy as Amy
Eric Norris as Golfer
Kyle Thomas as Mike
Pauline Burns as Lady Golfer 2
Paul Gadd as The Weatherman
Doug Wood as The Golfer/Actor

External links
 
 
 

1997 comedy films
1997 films
American comedy films
Direct-to-video comedy films
Films set in Alberta
Films shot in Alberta
Golf films
1990s English-language films
1990s American films